Road Rules: USA – The Second Adventure is the second season of the MTV reality television series Road Rules. It first aired on MTV on July 15, 1996. They started their journey in Key West, Florida.

Cast

Missions

Episodes

After filming

The Challenge

Challenge in bold indicates that the contestant was a finalist on The Challenge.

References
Season 2 Episode List

External links

Road Rules
Television shows set in Florida
1996 American television seasons